Shandel Samuel (born 14 December 1982) is a Vincentian footballer who currently plays for Barbadian side Rendezvous FC as a striker. He is also the all-time top scorer of the St. Vincent and the Grenadines national team.

International career
Samuel made his international debut as an 18-year-old in 2001. He scored 10 goals at the 2007 Caribbean Cup and a further five goals at the 2010 Caribbean Championship.

International goals
Scores and results list St. Vincent & the Grenadines' goal tally first.

Personal life
Samuel is the cousin of fellow Vincentian international footballer, Myron.

In 2011, Samuel was the highest paid Vincentian athlete, making $40,000 (USD).

References

External links
Shandel Samuel 5 goals in digicel cup

1982 births
Living people
Saint Vincent and the Grenadines footballers
Saint Vincent and the Grenadines expatriate footballers
Saint Vincent and the Grenadines international footballers
Association football forwards
San Juan Jabloteh F.C. players
North East Stars F.C. players
Expatriate footballers in Trinidad and Tobago
TT Pro League players
Ma Pau Stars S.C. players
Saint Vincent and the Grenadines expatriate sportspeople in Trinidad and Tobago
Saint Vincent and the Grenadines expatriate sportspeople in Malaysia
Expatriate footballers in Malaysia
Kedah Darul Aman F.C. players
Negeri Sembilan FA players
Expatriate footballers in Barbados
Rendezvous FC players